The BMW E31 is the first generation of the BMW 8 Series. It is a grand tourer built by BMW from 1990 to 1999 as a 2-door coupé, powered by either a V8 or V12 engine. Whilst it did supplant the original E24 based 6 Series in 1990, it was not a direct successor, but a new model class with a substantially higher price and performance than the 6 Series.

Development

Development of the 8 Series began in July 1981, with both the final design phase reaching completion in 1986, although the launch was delayed due to still-strong 6 Series sales. The 8 Series debuted at the Frankfurt Motor Show (IAA) in early September 1989. The 8 Series was designed to move beyond the market of the original 6 Series. The 8 Series had substantially improved performance, as well as a far higher purchase price.

Over 1.5 billion Deutsche Marks were spent on total development (2019 USD nearly $900 million). BMW used CAD tools, still unusual at the time, to design the car's all-new body.

The 8 Series offered the first V12 engine mated to a 6-speed manual transmission on a road car. It was one of the first vehicles to be fitted with an electronic drive-by-wire throttle. The 8 Series was one of BMW's first cars, together with the Z1, to use a multi-link rear axle.

CAD modelling allowed the 8 Series unibody to be  lighter than that of the preceding 6 Series (E24). However the production 8 Series was significantly heavier when completed due to the large engine and added luxury items—a source of criticism from those who wanted BMW to concentrate on the driving experience. Some of the car's weight may have been due to its pillar-less "hardtop" body style which lacked a "B" pillar.

Sales

Sales of the 8 Series were affected by the global recession of the early 1990s, the Persian Gulf War, and energy price spikes. As a result, plans for the high performance M8 variant were dropped in 1991.

BMW pulled the 8 Series from the North American market in 1997, having sold 6,920 cars. BMW continued production for other markets until 1999 having sold 30,609 in all markets.

Models 

The production totals for each model are:
 840i / 840Ci with the M60 engine: 4,728
 840Ci / 840Ci with the M62 engine: 3,075
 850i / 850Ci with the M70 engine: 20,072
 850i / 850Ci with the M73 engine: 1,218
 850CSi with the S70 engine: 1,510

840Ci

The 840Ci was offered with two different engines. From mid-1995, production phased in the newer 4.4-litre M62B44 V8 engine, which had better fuel economy and more torque, though power output remained unchanged.

The 840Ci was available with a 5-speed automatic transmission, though European cars were given the option of a 6-speed manual transmission. The only external features distinguishing the V8 model from the V12 models were the quad round exhausts, which were square in the V12 models. The 840Ci stayed in production until May 1999.

850i/Ci

It was available with either a 4-speed automatic or a 6-speed manual gearbox.

850Ci
There is some confusion over why and when the 850i became the 850Ci. The change happened around the introduction of the 840Ci in Autumn 1993. The confusion started when BMW installed the new M73B54 V12 engine in the car from October 1994, the new engine being from the newly launched E38 750i. This was not an immediate changeover, and both the M70 and M73-engined cars rolled off the production lines, both named 850Ci with those built before 10/94 using the older E32 type 5.0 M70.

850CSi

As a top-of-the-range variant of the 8 Series, the 850CSi took over from the prototype M8 variant. The 850CSi used the same engine as the 850i, which was tuned so significantly that BMW assigned it a new engine code: S70B56. Road & Track recorded a  time for the 850CSi of 5.9 seconds.

The 850CSi's modified suspension included stiffer springs and dampers that reduced the car's ride height. The recirculating ball steering ratio was dropped 15% over the standard E31 setup. The model also sported staggered throwing star wheels. The front and rear bumpers were reshaped for improved aerodynamic performance. Four round stainless steel exhaust tips replaced the square tips found on other models. The 6-speed manual gearbox was the only transmission option. In Europe, all 850CSi's came with four-wheel steering (AHK - Aktive Hinterachs-Kinematik, Active rear axle Kinematics), upgraded and ventilated brakes with floating front discs, rear differential oil cooler, engine oil cooler, two-tone interior, sports seats, and reshaped mirrors. In the United States, the cars instead received "BMW Motorsport" writing on the doorhandles.

Production ended in late 1996 because the S70 engine could not be modified to comply with new emission regulations without substantial re-engineering.

Other models
Alpina produced two 8 Series variants, the B12 5.0 and the B12 5.7. There have also been aftermarket conversions to change it to a drop-top convertible.

Engines 

2017 United States Environmental Protection Agency estimates for cars equipped with automatic transmission:
840Ci:
Fuel type: Premium
city: 
highway: 
combined: 
850Ci:
Fuel type: Premium
city: 
highway: 
combined:

Transmissions 
The 840Ci (4.0/4.4 L V8) models were equipped with a 5-speed automatic transmission or a 6-speed manual transmission. The 850i/850Ci (V12) models each use either a 4-speed automatic transmission or a 6-speed manual transmission, a 5-speed automatic transmission was fitted from mid-1994. The high performance 850CSi model only came with a 6-speed manual transmission.

Prototype models

830i 
The 830i was a prototype that did not reach production. Eighteen cars were produced, thirteen of which had an automatic gearbox fitted. The model was dropped in favour of the 840Ci and almost all of the 18 cars were dismantled; one car is in a BMW museum.

850i Cabrio 
The 8 Series had been planned from the start with a convertible version in mind. Although the 850i Cabrio was developed to production readiness, it never went into production. At a relatively late date it was decided that this model was unlikely to recover its development cost. A prototype in red resides in the BMW Museum in Munich.

M8 
The M8 was originally envisioned as a Ferrari competitor equipped with a special version of the S70 engine, with modifications including a displacement increase to just over 6 litres, dual overhead camshafts for each cylinder bank, individual throttle bodies with roller valves, four valves per cylinder, carbon fibre intake manifolds and continuously variable valve timing. A common misconception is that this engine powered the McLaren F1. The S70/2 used in the McLaren F1 was not based directly on the prototype 48-valve V12 used in the M8, and was a completely new design.

The car was given two intakes by its rear arches for engine and differential oil cooling. It was also given a wider track via a wider drive axle as well as uprated front brakes. The interior was completely stripped, with bucket seats and additional gauges for oil pressure, oil temperature, and water temperature. The M8 was given a B-pillar to retain structural rigidity as well as having its pop up headlights deleted from the car.

Other modifications include bodywork modifications such as a new front bumper, new wing mirrors, more flared wheel arches and a vent in the bonnet. The car's kerb weight was reduced to less than 1450 kilograms by making elements of the car glass reinforced plastic (such as the bonnet, doors and boot lid), using carbon fibre wheels and removing the rear seats from the car. The windows were made of Lexan. The oil reservoir was moved to the trunk of the car; oil pipes went through the roof of the car.

The project was eventually scrapped because BMW decided that there was no market for a high performance variant of the 8 Series primarily because of the on-going economic recession of the 1990s. The only prototype ever produced (one that was reportedly not even safe for normal road usage) was locked away by BMW in the company's Giftschrank (poison storage). BMW and the M Division had strongly denied that the car was even a possibility since the initial stages of its development. A world exclusive feature in the February 2010 issue of BMW Car Magazine, however, revealed that the M8 prototype still exists in its entirety. The car was unveiled to journalists for the first time on July 2, 2010, at the BMW Museum in Munich. The only public showing of the car happened on August 17, 2012, during 'The Legends of the Autobahn' car show held in Carmel, California. The car was specially shipped from Germany for the appearance.

Although the M8 was never produced, the 850CSi was also tuned by BMW's M division. Aside from sporting an M-tuned engine (as identified by the S prefix instead of the M prefix that a non-M tuned engine would bear), the car's VIN identifies the car as being built by BMW Motorsport (a WBS prefix) instead of BMW AG (WBA prefix). Per BMW's own protocol, the 850CSi as marketed was essentially a de-tuned version of the putative M8.

Alpina models

B12 5.0 
The B12 5.0 was built from 1990 to 1994 based on the BMW E31 850i with an Alpina-modified BMW M70 V12 (shared with the E32 B12 5.0) producing  and mated to an automatic transmission.

B12 5.7 
The B12 5.7 was available from 1992, based on the BMW 850CSi with the BMW S70B56 V12 engine bored out to 5.7 litres along with a modified intake, crankshaft, camshafts and a stainless steel exhaust system as well as a 6-speed manual gearbox. The modified engine produced . The carbon-fibre bonnet had cooling vents and a NACA duct for improved engine cooling.

Motorsport
The 8 Series is a very rare car to see in any form of motorsport. One of the most successful examples was built by Wagenstetter Motorsport however, and, until recently, was raced in the VLN Nürburgring endurance championship. It is based on an 840i, but now has an E39 M5 5.0-litre V8, which has  and  torque, and a six-speed gearbox from the same car.

References

E31
8 Series (E31)
Rear-wheel-drive vehicles
Vehicles with four-wheel steering
Cars introduced in 1989
Coupés
Grand tourers
2+2 coupés
Cars discontinued in 1999